Associação Desportiva Freipaulistano, or Freipaulistano, as they are usually called, is a Brazilian football team from Frei Paulo in Sergipe, founded on August 29, 2016.

Freipaulistano is currently ranked fourth among Sergipe teams in CBF's national club ranking, at 151st place overall.

Stadium
Freipaulistano play their home games at Estádio Jairton Menezes de Mendonça. The stadium has a maximum capacity of 4,000 people.

Honours
 Campeonato Sergipano
 Winners (1): 2019

 Campeonato Sergipano Série A2
 Winners (1): 2016

References

External links
 Freipaulistano on OGol

 
Association football clubs established in 2016
Freipaulistano
2016 establishments in Brazil